United Nations Security Council Resolution 189, adopted unanimously on June 4, 1964, deplored an incident caused by the penetration of units of the Republic of Vietnam into Cambodia and requested compensation for the Cambodians.  The resolution then requested that all States and authorities recognize and respect Cambodia's neutrality and territorial integrity, deciding to send 3 of its members to the places the most recent incidents had occurred to report back to the Council in 45 days with suggestions.

Cambodia had previously complained of acts of aggression and intrusions by South Vietnamese and American troops into its territory. On July 24, 1964, the mission sent by the Council reported that the situation at the frontier remained tense and a solution had yet to be found.

See also
List of United Nations Security Council Resolutions 101 to 200 (1953–1965)
Vietnam War

References

External links
 
Text of the Resolution at undocs.org

 0189
1964 in Vietnam
1964 in Cambodia
Vietnam War
 0189
 0189
Cambodia–Vietnam relations
June 1964 events